Ana Bustorff (born 15 November 1959 in Miragaia, Porto) is a Portuguese actress. She appeared in more than eighty films since 1980. She also appears in the TV soap opera 'A Única Mulher'.

Selected filmography

References

External links 

Biography (in Portuguese)

1959 births
Living people
Portuguese film actresses
Portuguese people of Italian descent
Portuguese television actresses